DeWitt County is a county located in the U.S. state of Illinois. As of the 2010 census, the population was 16,561. Its county seat is Clinton. The county was formed on March 1, 1839, from Macon and McLean counties. The county was named in honor of the seventh Governor of New York State, DeWitt Clinton.

DeWitt County is included in Bloomington–Normal, IL Metropolitan Statistical Area.

The U.S. Census Bureau and the USGS list the county's name as De Witt, although the county uses the name DeWitt (no space).

History

Geography

Climate and weather

Adjacent counties
 McLean County - north
 Piatt County - east
 Macon County - south
 Logan County - west

Major highways
  Interstate 74
  US Route 51
  US Route 150
  Illinois Route 10
  Illinois Route 48
  Illinois Route 54

Demographics

As of the 2010 United States Census, there were 16,561 people, 6,811 households, and 4,618 families residing in the county. The racial makeup of the county was 96.8% white, 0.5% black or African American, 0.4% Asian, 0.2% American Indian, 0.9% from other races, and 1.2% from two or more races. Those of Hispanic or Latino origin made up 2.1% of the population. In terms of ancestry, 31.2% were American, 21.7% were German, 15.8% were English, and 12.3% were Irish.

Of the 6,811 households, 30.1% had children under the age of 18 living with them, 53.0% were married couples living together, 10.0% had a female householder with no husband present, 32.2% were non-families, and 27.5% of all households were made up of individuals. The average household size was 2.39 and the average family size was 2.88. The median age was 41.7 years.

The median income for a household in the county was $45,347 and the median income for a family was $56,806. Males had a median income of $41,649 versus $27,729 for females. The per capita income for the county was $24,320. About 6.4% of families and 8.6% of the population were below the poverty line, including 12.2% of those under age 18 and 6.6% of those age 65 or over.

Communities

Cities
 Clinton (seat)
 Farmer City

Villages
 DeWitt
 Kenney
 Wapella
 Waynesville
 Weldon

Townships
De Witt County is divided into thirteen townships:

 Barnett
 Clintonia
 Creek
 DeWitt
 Harp
 Nixon
 Rutledge
 Santa Anna
 Texas
 Tunbridge
 Wapella
 Waynesville
 Wilson

Unincorporated Communities

 Birkbeck
 Bucks
 Carle Springs
 Fullerton
 Hallsville
 Jenkins
 Lane
 Midland City
 Ospur
 Parnell
 Rowell
 Solomon
 Tabor
 Tunbridge
 Watkins
 Weedman

Politics
DeWitt is frequently a Republican county. It has not been carried by a Democratic presidential candidate since Lyndon Johnson’s 1964 landslide, and even before that it was carried by Democrats only in strong winning elections like 1936, 1932, 1916, 1912 and 1892.

See also
 National Register of Historic Places listings in DeWitt County, Illinois

Notes

References
 United States Census Bureau 2007 TIGER/Line Shapefiles
 United States Board on Geographic Names (GNIS)
 United States National Atlas

External links

 DeWitt County

 
1839 establishments in Illinois
Illinois counties
Populated places established in 1839